St. Nikolausbreen is a glacier in Sørkapp Land at Spitsbergen, Svalbard. It is located northeast of St. Nikolausfjellet. The glacier is named after Saint Nicholas, archbishop and patron saint of sailors.

References

Glaciers of Spitsbergen